Lille Skensved is a small railway town located in Køge and Solrød municipalities, at the railway line Lille Syd between Roskilde and Køge about 7 kilometres north of Køge. The total population of Lille Skensved is 1,565 (1 January 2022), 1,509 in Køge Municipality and 56 in Solrød Municipality.

The towns most domineering place of work is CP Kelco Aps, the largest plant in the world producing pectin, carrageenan and refined locust bean gum.

Notable people 
 DJ Noize (born 1975 in Lille Skensved) a Danish Hip hop-DJ,

References

Cities and towns in Region Zealand
Køge Municipality
Solrød Municipality